An Adalath is a lower Indian court.

See also
Indian Supreme Court
High Courts of India
Indian Penal Code

Judiciary of India
Hindi words and phrases